Reginald Ely or Reynold of Ely (fl. 1438–1471) was an English master mason and architect working in Gothic architecture in the Kingdom of England in the 15th century. He "must be regarded as one of the greatest C15 English architects" for his contribution to King's College Chapel, Cambridge - one of the most salient examples of the Perpendicular style which characterized the 14th–17th centuries of English Gothic architecture.

Reginald's career is first attested in 1438 during his work at Peterhouse in Cambridge; there he was responsible for a staircase to the college library and possibly for part of the kitchen-wing of the great hall.  He may also be responsible for the parish church of Burwell, Cambridgeshire (1454–64) and after 1446 for Queens' College, Cambridge.

He was most likely the architect of the chapel of King's College, part of the University of Cambridge and worked there since King Henry VI of England laid the first stone in 1446. Two years earlier Reginald was charged with sourcing craftsmen for the chapel's construction.  He continued to work on the site until building was interrupted in 1461, having probably designed the elevations.  The original plans called for lierne vaulting, and the piers of the choir were built to conform with them.  Ultimately, a complex fan vault was constructed instead. Reginald probably designed the window at the extreme east of the church's north side: the east window of the easternmost subsidiary chapel, which unlike the Perpendicular style of the others is in curvilinear Gothic style.

References

15th-century English architects
Gothic architects
1438 births
1471 deaths